White Darkness or The White Darkness may refer to: 

White Darkness (album), by the Swedish rock band Nightingale
White Darkness (novel), a Doctor Who novel by David A. McIntee
The White Darkness (film), a 2002 collaboration between Richard Stanley and Simon Boswell
The White Darkness (Grann book), a 2018 non-fiction book by David Grann
The White Darkness (novel), a children's novel by Geraldine McCaughrean